Front de Libération de la Côte des Somalis (English: Front for the Liberation of the Somali Coast) was a nationalist organization, and later a guerrilla group, in the French Territory of the Afars and the Issas in present-day Djibouti. It competes with the Djibouti Liberation Movement (MLD), supported by Ethiopia. The FLCS was recognized as a national liberation movement by the Organization of African Unity (OAU), which participated in its financing.

History
The FLCS was established in 1960 by Mahamoud Harbi. Its founding president was Adan Abdulle. French government policemen and Djibouti nationalists clashed in Djibouti City on August 25–26, 1966, resulting in the deaths of ten civilians and one government policeman. Twenty-seven individuals were arrested for their involvement in the demonstrations. The French government deported some 6,000 ethnic Somalis to Somalia between August 1966 and March 1967. Djibouti nationalists demonstrated for independence on September 13–21, 1966, resulting in the deaths of 21 individuals. The organization mainly drew its support from the [Somali clans. On September 21, 1966, Governor-General Louis Saget announced the French government's decision to hold a referendum on the status of French Somaliland. Six individuals were killed by French government troops near Djibouti City between October 1 and November 21, 1966. Abdourahman Ahmed Hassan, also known as Gaboode, was made the Secretary General in 1966 after serving a two-year prison sentence. Eighteen individuals were arrested for their involvement in the demonstrations.  

Some 60 percent of voters, mostly ethnic Afars, favored remaining as an overseas territory of France (known as the French Territory of the Afars and Issas) in a referendum held on March 19, 1967. French government troops suppressed demonstrations in Djibouti City on March 20, 1967, resulting in the deaths of eleven individuals. Four individuals were killed by French government troops on April 6, 1967. French Somaliland was renamed the French Territory of the Afars and the Issas on July 3, 1967. Legislative elections were held on November 17, 1968, and the Afar Democratic Rally (Rassemblement Démocratique Afar–RDA) won 20 out of 32 seats in the assembly.

FLCS began armed activities outside Djibouti in 1968. From May 1969, its general secretary is Aden Robleh Awaleh. In January 1970 the Front de Libération de la Côte des Somalis claimed an attack on the popular Palm in Zinc, a bar in Djibouti City.

Legislative elections were held on November 18, 1973.  The Majorité coalition, consisting mostly of ethnic Afars, won most of the seats in the assembly. Eleven individuals were killed in political violence in Djibouti on May 25–26, 1975. In 1975 the  Front de Libération de la Côte des Somalis kidnapped the ambassador of France in Mogadishu - Somalia, Jean Guery, to be exchanged against two activists of FLCS members who was imprisoned in mainland France. In December 1975, it claimed a failed attack against Ali Aref Bourhan.

On December 31, 1975, the UN General Assembly called on the French government to withdraw from the colony. In February 1976, the FLCS claims the hijacking of a school bus, which ends with the death of the hostage-takers and two children. The Organization of African Unity (OAU) sent a 15-member fact-finding mission (Egypt, Guinea, Liberia, Mozambique, Senegal, Tanzania, Uganda, Zaire) to the region from April 29 to May 11, 1976.

French government troops fired on demonstrators in Tadjoura on May 2, 1976, resulting in the death of one individual. Thirteen individuals were killed in political violence in Djibouti on July 10, 1976. Abdallah Mohamed Kamil was elected prime minister by the Chamber of Deputies on July 29, 1976.  Representatives of the French government and Djibouti nationalists held negotiations in Paris beginning on February 28, 1977.  The OAU facilitated negotiations between representatives of the French government and Djibouti nationalists in Accra, Ghana from March 28 to April 1, 1977.  Constituent Assembly elections were held on May 8, 1977, and the People's Rally for Independence (Rassemblement Populaire pour Independence-RPI) won 65 out of 65 seats in the assembly. Some 99 percent of Djibouti voters favored independence from France in a referendum held on May 8, 1977. On June 27, 1977, officially marking Djibouti's independence.

The FLCS' military struggle was actively supported by the government of Somalia. The group also received assistance from the OAU as a national liberation movement. In the 1971-1972 period, the FLCS received 1500 pounds sterling from the OAU, 0.14% of the total amount donated by the body to different African liberation movements at the time. The FLCS evolves in its demands between the request of integration in a possible "Great Somalia" or the simple independence of the territory. In 1975 FLCS approaches the African People's League for the Independence and finally opts for independence path, causing tensions with Mogadishu, Somalia. At independence of the territory on 27 June 1977, 2,000 to 2,500 FLCS militants are integrated into the new Djiboutian Armed Forces, but not those of the MLD despite the request of Ahmed Dini.

References

Rebel groups in Djibouti
Horn of Africa
History of Djibouti
French Territory of the Afars and the Issas